Geophilus crenulatus is a species of soil centipede in the family Geophilidae found in a ravine above the Hemis monastery in India, 3525 meters above sea level. It was originally thought to be a subspecies of G. intermissus and named Geophilus intermissus var. crenulata. The original description of this species is based on a specimen measuring 22 mm in length with 57 pairs of legs.

References 

crenulatus
Arthropods of India
Animals described in 1936
Taxa named by Filippo Silvestri